The Auntie from Chicago ( Ê theía apó to Sikágo; also known as Aunt from Chicago) is a 1957 Greek theatrical comedy film directed by Alekos Sakellarios and produced by Finos Films. The film made 142,459 tickets.

Plot
A middle-aged man's (Makris) conservative life is disturbed, when his sister (Vasileiadou) returns to Greece, after many years in Chicago. Her arrival breathes new air to the family, and some extreme ideas of how to get her shy nieces to marry.

Cast
Orestis Makris as Harilaos Bardas
Georgia Vasileiadou as Kalliopi Papas
Eleni Zafeiriou as Efterpi Barda (wife of Harilaos)
Gelly Mavropoulou as Eleni Barda (daughter)
Tzeni Karezi as Katina Barda (daughter)
Margarita Papageorgiou as Angeliki Barda (daughter)
Pantelis Zervos as Xenofon Vlassopoulos
Stefanos Stratigos as Nikos Kadris
Thodoros Dimitriou as Takis Zerigkas
Dimitris Papamichael as Kostakis
Vangelis Ploios as guy from the beach
Kostas Papahristos as police officer

External links

I theia apo to Chicago at cine.gr

1957 films
1957 comedy films
1950s Greek-language films
Finos Film films
Greek comedy films